União Esporte Clube, commonly referred to as União Rondonópolis, is a Brazilian professional club based in Rondonópolis, Mato Grosso founded on 6 June 1973. It competes in the Campeonato Brasileiro Série D, the fourth tier of Brazilian football, as well as in the Campeonato Mato-Grossense, the top flight of the Mato Grosso state football league.

History
União Esporte Clube were founded on June 6, 1973. They won the Torneio Incentivo in 1975, 1976 and in 1979. União were eliminated in the first stage in the Green module of the Copa João Havelange in 2000.

The club competed in the 2009 Copa do Brasil, when they gained national fame after beating Internacional 1–0 on February 18, in the first leg of the first round of the cup. However, the club were eliminated in that round, after being defeated 2–0 in the second leg.

Stadium
União Rondonópolis play their home games at Estádio Engenheiro Lutero Lopes. The stadium has a maximum capacity of 18,000 people.

Achievements
 Campeonato Mato-Grossense:
 Winners (1): 2010
 Torneio Incentivo:
 Winners (3): 1975, 1976, 1979

References

 
Association football clubs established in 1973
Football clubs in Mato Grosso
1973 establishments in Brazil